Brendan Cathbad Myers is a Canadian philosopher and author known for his contributions in environmental philosophy, Druidry and Neo-Druidism, mythology, and applied virtue ethics.

Philosophy and writings
Normative in their conception, Myers' works fundamentally examine ideas regarding the interconnectedness of creation and emphasize the importance of strong moral character as vital to the health and well-being of the world and society.  Myers criticizes utilitarian views, especially "negative" utilitarianism, which holds that ethics require nothing more than the minimization of harm, and of deontological views, which emphasize social duties and adhering to social norms, i.e. rules. As an alternative to utilitarianism and deontology, Myers explores the ethics of character and identity, self-knowledge and shared life.

Biographical information
Born in 1974, in Guelph, Ontario, Canada, Brendan was raised in Elora, Ontario, a small village north of Guelph in Wellington County, Ontario. He was born the eldest son of an Irish-Canadian family and completed a bachelor's degree in drama and philosophy in 1996 and then a master's degree in philosophy in 1999, both from the University of Guelph. While at university, he became more involved in ethics and environmentalism and he converted from Catholicism to paganism, becoming an activist member of the neo-pagan community. Myers continued his academic career in Ireland, and eventually completed a doctoral dissertation entitled "Time and the Land" at the National University of Ireland, Galway.

Professional life
His first published work was a play entitled Visions of a Better Way, which won a competition for high school students run by University of Guelph's department of English.

Myers attended the University of Guelph for undergraduate studies in drama, starting in January 1992.

He further attended Memorial University of Newfoundland, reading folklore there in 1994.

Myers then began his master's studies at Guelph in 1998, majoring in philosophy. In 2000, he published a dissertation titled "Animism, Spirit, and Environmental Activism", and was matriculated.

For the two years following, he served as president of a labour union (CUPE local.)

Myers began doctoral studies in philosophy at the National University of Ireland, Galway in 2001, touring the European continent, especially England and Germany.

He completed doctoral studies in 2005 with a dissertation entitled "Time and the Land: Four Approaches to Environmental Ethics, Climate Change, and Future Generations".

Pagan activism
Myers returned to Canada in late 2005, and taught philosophy at several universities and colleges in Ontario and Quebec. In 2007, he worked as a contract researcher for the Government of Canada studying Aboriginal values and ethics, morals and logic in relation to police work and peacekeeping and consensus government.

In 2008 he was awarded the Mount Haemus Award for research in Druidry, from the OBOD in association with Salisbury Cathedral.

Myers currently lives in Gatineau, Quebec, where he is professor of philosophy and humanities at CEGEP Heritage College. He claims to be the only openly pagan philosophy professor in the world.

Academic influence
Myers' works have been quoted in the published works of numerous neopagan writers, including Emma Restall-Orr (in "Living with Honour"), Philip Carr-Gomm (in "What do Druids Believe?"), Graeme Talboys (in "The Way of the Druid"), Janet Farrar and Gavin Bone (in "Progressive Witchcraft"), and Isaac Bonewits (in "Bonewits Essential Guide to Druidism"). His work also appears on pages 185 to 191 of "Out of the Broom Closet" edited by Arin Murphy-Hiscock.

Published works

Non-fiction
 Dangerous Religion: Environmental Spirituality And Its Activist Dimension (2004). Dubsar House/Earth Religion Press: El Sobrante, CA, USA. .
 The Mysteries of Druidry: Celtic Mysticism, Theory, and Practice (2006). New Page Books: Franklin Lakes, NJ, USA. .
 The Other Side of Virtue: Where Our Virtues Really Came from, What They Really Mean, and Where They Might Be Taking Us (2008). O Books: Ropley, Hampshire, UK. .
 A Pagan Testament: The Literary Heritage of the World's Oldest New Religion, (2008). O Books, Ropley, Hampshire, UK. .
 Loneliness and Revelation: A Study of the Sacred Part One, (2010). O Books, Ropley, Hampshire, UK. .
 Circles of Meaning, Labyrinths of Fear: The 22 Relationships of a Spiritual Life and Culture -- And Why They Need Protection. (2012). Moon Books. 
 Clear and Present Thinking: A Handbook in Logic and Rationality (First Ed., 2013; Second Ed., 2019). Northwest Passage Books. 
The Earth, the Gods, and the Soul: A History of Pagan Philosophy from the Iron Age to the 21st Century. (2013). Moon Books/John Hunt Publishing. 
Reclaiming Civilization: A Case for Optimism for the Future of Humanity. (2017). Moon Books/John Hunt Publishing.

Fiction
 Fellwater (2012). Northwest Passage Books. 
 Hallowstone (2012). Northwest Passage Books. 
Clan Fianna (2014). Northwest Passage Books. 
A Trick of the Light (2014). Northwest Passage Books. 
The Seekers (2014). Northwest Passage Books. 
Elderdown (2015). Northwest Passage Books. 
Flight of the Siren (2020). Northwest Passage Books.

Game
 Iron Age - Council of the Clans: A strategy game of power, honour, and democracy (2012)

See also
 Philosophy
Philosophers
Neo-druidism
 Neopaganism
 Virtue ethics

References

External links
 Brendan Myers' Website 
 Wiccan Biography
 Plutonica

1974 births
Living people
Canadian philosophers
21st-century Canadian philosophers
Canadian non-fiction writers
Critical theorists
Canadian logicians
Philosophers of culture
Philosophers of education
Philosophers of history
Philosophers of logic
Philosophers of religion
Political philosophers
Canadian ethicists
Canadian social commentators
Social philosophers
Theorists on Western civilization
University of Guelph alumni
People from Centre Wellington
Alumni of the National University of Ireland
Canadian modern pagans
Modern pagan philosophers
Modern pagan novelists